Ariel Investments is an investment company located in Chicago, Illinois. It specializes in small and mid-capitalized stocks based in the United States.

History
Ariel was founded in 1983 by John W. Rogers, Jr., who is chairman and Co-CEO of the company. Mellody Hobson has been president of the company since May 2000. In July 2019, Hobson was appointed Co-CEO of the company. The company employs 107 people, with the employees and the board owning 95% of the company. The firm has $15 billion in assets under management as of January 31, 2021.

Ariel is a minority-owned investment company. It claims to be the largest minority-owned investment firm. The company also supports the African-American Community of Bronzeville by giving its support to nonprofits such as The Renaissance Collaborative.

Through former Mayor Daley’s New School Initiative Program, Ariel Investments was awarded a corporate sponsorship of a Chicago public school in 1996.  Hence, the birth of Ariel Community Academy – a public school located on the Southside of Chicago.

References

External links
 Official website

Financial services companies established in 1983
African-American organizations
Financial services companies of the United States
Companies based in Chicago
1983 establishments in the United States
1983 establishments in Illinois
Companies established in 1983